The Liberty Lady Flames basketball team is the women's basketball team that represents Liberty University in Lynchburg, Virginia. Since 2018, the Lady Flames have competed in the ASUN Conference. They are currently coached by Carey Green.

History
Liberty was founded in 1971 as Lynchburg Baptist College, making it the second-youngest institution in NCAA Division I (only Florida Gulf Coast University, founded in 1991, is younger). While men's basketball began play a year later, women's basketball did not start play until 1975, the same year in which the school changed its name to Liberty Baptist College and joined the National Association of Intercollegiate Athletics (NAIA). In 1980, LBC joined the NCAA as a Division II member while retaining its NAIA membership. In 1983, LBC gave up its NAIA membership and moved full-time to D-II. They were members of the East Coast Athletic Conference (for a brief amount of time in 1983) and the Mason-Dixon Athletic Conference (1983–88) in their time in Division II. During that time, LBC adopted its current name of Liberty University in 1985.

Liberty joined Division I in 1988, followed by a move to the Big South Conference in 1991. After a 5–22 season in 1995–96, the Lady Flames went 22–8 the next year while running the table and winning the Big South championship, their first ever conference title in history along with the bid to go to the NCAA tournament; they were beaten by Old Dominion 102–52 in the first round. The following year, they set the school record for most wins in program history along with a second straight Big South Tournament title and NCAA appearance with an undefeated regular season and wins in the conference tournament to go 28–0 before a loss to Tennessee 102–58 in the first round of the NCAA tournament (they tied the record for wins in 2008, going 28–4, including a Big South title). They have won just two NCAA Tournament games (2005), advancing to the Sweet Sixteen as a #13 seed after beating Penn State 78–70 and DePaul 88–79 before losing to #1 LSU 90–48 in the regional semifinals. They have also made an appearance in the WNIT (2016), losing to Villanova 67–51 in the first round. As of the end of the 2015–16 season, the Lady Flames have an all-time record of 674–469.

NCAA tournament results

Footnotes

References

External links